Vagner Souta (born 10 February 1991) is a Brazilian canoeist. He competed in the men's K-4 1000 metres events at the 2016 Summer Olympics. He competed at the 2020 Summer Olympics.

References

External links
 

1991 births
Living people
Brazilian male canoeists
Olympic canoeists of Brazil
Canoeists at the 2016 Summer Olympics
Pan American Games medalists in canoeing
Pan American Games silver medalists for Brazil
Pan American Games bronze medalists for Brazil
Canoeists at the 2015 Pan American Games
Medalists at the 2015 Pan American Games
Medalists at the 2019 Pan American Games
Sportspeople from Mato Grosso do Sul
Canoeists at the 2020 Summer Olympics
21st-century Brazilian people